The eclipse parrotfish (Scarus russelii), also known as Russell's parrotfish, is a species of parrotfish native to Indian ocean countries such as Madagascar, Seychelles, and Mauritius to south India, Sri Lanka and Thailand.

References

WoRMS
Animal diversity

External links
 

eclipse parrotfish
Fish of the Indian Ocean
Marine fauna of East Africa
Taxa named by Achille Valenciennes
eclipse parrotfish